María Dolores "Lola" Sánchez Caldentey (17 March 1978) is a Spanish politician, and a former Member of the European Parliament, one of the five MEPs elected by Podemos in the 2014 European Parliament election.

References

External links
 Lola Sánchez Caldentey at the European Parliament

1978 births
Living people
People from Valencia
MEPs for Spain 2014–2019
21st-century women MEPs for Spain
Podemos (Spanish political party) MEPs